The 2013 CFL Draft took place on Monday, May 6, 2013 at 12:00 PM ET on TSN. 60 players were chosen from among eligible players from Canadian Universities across the country, as well as Canadian players playing in the NCAA. The Montreal Alouettes had the most selections with nine, followed by the Hamilton Tiger-Cats with eight. Each of the West Division teams had seven picks while Winnipeg had six. The defending Grey Cup champion Toronto Argonauts had five picks and Ottawa chose four players from NCAA schools that would play another year. A total of 16 trades were made involving draft picks from this year, including two made on draft day itself, with 12 being made by the Edmonton Eskimos. Of the 60 draft selections, 44 players were drafted from Canadian Interuniversity Sport institutions, which is the highest number of CIS players taken since the 1987 CFL Draft when 50 of 72 were taken. It is also the highest percentage (73.3%) of CIS players taken since 2009 (38 of 48, 79.1%, were selected then).

The Ottawa expansion team was scheduled to pick last in the first four rounds of the 2012 CFL Draft, with selections being limited to NCAA redshirt juniors. Due to stadium delays, Ottawa will join the Canadian Football League in 2014, and participated in this year's draft instead. 18 players were classified as redshirt juniors with 12 being selected in this year's draft. The draft also expand to seven rounds this year for the first time since 1996, with the CFL citing stronger Canadian talent as a reason for the expansion. 

The first two rounds were broadcast live on TSN with CFL Commissioner Mark Cohon announcing each selection. The production was hosted by Rod Black and featured the CFL on TSN panel which includes Duane Forde, Chris Schultz, Paul LaPolice, Dave Naylor, Stefan Ptaszek, Brian Dobie, and Danny Maciocia who analyzed the teams' needs and picks.

Top prospects 
A total of 55 Canadian prospects participated in the 2013 CFL Combine. The official CFL Scouting Bureau rankings are listed below.

Trades
In the explanations below, (D) denotes trades that took place during the draft, while (PD) indicates trades completed pre-draft.

Round one
 Edmonton → Montreal (PD). Edmonton traded this selection, Derek Schiavone, and a fourth round pick in this year's draft to Montreal for Brody McKnight.

Round two
 Saskatchewan → Calgary (PD). Saskatchewan traded this selection and a third round pick in the 2012 CFL Draft to Calgary for a second round pick in the 2012 CFL Draft and a fifth round pick in the 2012 CFL Draft.
 Edmonton → BC (PD). Edmonton traded this selection and a second round pick in the 2014 CFL Draft to BC for Mike Reilly and a second round pick in this year's draft.
 BC → Edmonton (PD). BC traded this selection and Mike Reilly to BC for a second round pick in this year's draft and a second round pick in the 2014 CFL Draft.
 Hamilton → Edmonton (PD). Hamilton traded this selection and a third round pick in this year's draft to Edmonton for a second round pick in this year's draft and the rights to Hasan Hazime.
 Edmonton → Hamilton (PD). Edmonton traded this selection and the rights to Hasan Hazime to Hamilton for a second round pick in this year's draft and a third round pick in this year's draft.

Round three
 Edmonton → BC (PD). Edmonton traded this selection to BC for Jerome Messam. This pick was originally a fifth round selection, but it was upgraded to round three.
 Hamilton → Edmonton (PD). Hamilton traded this selection and a second round pick in this year's draft to Edmonton for a second round pick in this year's draft and the rights to Hasan Hazime.
 Toronto → Edmonton (PD). Toronto traded this selection to Edmonton for two fifth round picks in this year's draft and Jermaine Reid.
 Saskatchewan → Toronto (D). Saskatchewan traded this selection to Toronto for three fifth round picks in this year's draft.

Round four
 Hamilton → Calgary (PD). Hamilton traded this selection and Jadon Wagner to Calgary for a fifth round pick in this year's draft and Milton Collins.
 Saskatchewan → Edmonton (PD). Saskatchewan traded this selection and the playing rights to Matthew O'Donnell to Edmonton for Greg Carr and a fifth round pick in this year's draft.
 Edmonton → Montreal (PD). Edmonton traded this selection, Derek Schiavone, and a first round pick in this year's draft to Montreal for Brody McKnight.
 Toronto → Hamilton (PD). Toronto traded this selection and Dee Webb to Hamilton for Maurice Mann.
 Calgary → Edmonton (D). Calgary traded this selection to Edmonton for Étienne Légaré.

Round five
 Winnipeg → Saskatchewan (PD). Winnipeg traded this selection and Odell Willis to Saskatchewan for a second and fourth round pick in the 2012 CFL Draft.
 Calgary → Hamilton (PD). Calgary traded this selection and Milton Collins to Hamilton for a fourth round pick in this year's draft and Jadon Wagner.
 Edmonton → Saskatchewan (PD). Edmonton traded this selection and Greg Carr to Saskatchewan for the playing rights to Matthew O'Donnell and a fourth round pick in this year's draft.
 Saskatchewan → Edmonton (PD). Saskatchewan traded two fifth round selections to Edmonton for Brody McKnight and a sixth round pick in this year's draft.
 Edmonton → Toronto (PD). Edmonton traded two fifth round selections and Jermaine Reid to Toronto for a third round pick in this year's draft.
 Toronto → Saskatchewan (D). Toronto traded three fifth round selections to Saskatchewan for a third round pick in this year's draft.

Round six
 Edmonton → Montreal (PD). Edmonton traded this selection and a sixth round pick in the 2012 CFL Draft to Montreal for Dylan Steenbergen.
 Saskatchewan → Edmonton (PD). Saskatchewan traded this selection to Edmonton for left tackle Xavier Fulton.
 Montreal → Edmonton (PD). Montreal traded this selection to Edmonton for Jerome Messam.
 Edmonton → Saskatchewan (PD). Edmonton traded this selection and Brody McKnight to Saskatchewan for two fifth round picks in this year's draft.
 Edmonton → Calgary (PD). Edmonton traded this selection to Calgary for a sixth round pick in this year's draft and Junius Coston.
 Calgary → Edmonton (PD). Calgary traded this selection and Junius Coston to Edmonton for a sixth round pick in this year's draft.

Round one

Round two

Round three

Round four

Round five

Round six

Round seven

References

Canadian College Draft
2013 in Canadian football